Matteo Nana (born 25 August 1974) is an Italian former alpine skier who competed in the 1998 Winter Olympics.

References

External links
 

 

1974 births
Living people
Italian male alpine skiers
Olympic alpine skiers of Italy
Alpine skiers at the 1998 Winter Olympics
Alpine skiers of Fiamme Gialle